Ek Nayi Ummeed - Roshni (English: A New Hope - Roshni) is an Indian medical drama television series, which premiered on 13 July 2015 and broadcast on Life OK. The series aires on Monday through Friday nights. The series is produced by Pulse Media Entertainment. The shooting of the series is shot in London. The shooting of the entire series is held in a real hospital. Pooja Gor and Sahil Anand are seen playing the female and male lead roles respectively.

Cast
Pooja Gor as Dr. Roshni Singh
Sahil Anand as Dr. Nikhil Malhotara aka Nik
Himmanshoo A. Malhotra as Dr. Sameer Purohit
Amol Palekar as Dr. Amar Kishore Singh
Raghubir Yadav as Badri
Anjali Pandey as Mona 
Imran Javed as Dr. Nitin Patel aka Doodle
Kurush Deboo as Dr. Anand Singh
Divya Seth Shah as Dr. Vasundhara Singh
Inderjeet Sagoo as Dr. Rajat Singh
Aakash Sahay as Sharad
Kalpesh Rajgor as Dr. Rastogi
Rahul Vora as Dr. Raghunandan

References

External links

Official website on Hotstar

2015 Indian television series debuts
2015 Indian television series endings
Hindi-language television shows
Indian medical television series
Television shows set in Mumbai
Life OK original programming